Desmond Tremaine Mason (born October 11, 1977) is an American painter and former professional basketball player. He played as a shooting guard and small forward. Mason has also found success as an artist, working in a variety of media. Currently, he is an NBA Analyst and Sports radio co-host for The Franchise, a sports talk station in Oklahoma City.

Professional career

Seattle SuperSonics (2000–2003) 
Desmond Mason was drafted out of Oklahoma State University by the Seattle SuperSonics with the 17th pick of the 2000 NBA draft. In 2001, he became the first SuperSonics' player in franchise history to win the NBA Slam Dunk Contest. He also finished in second place in the 2003 contest behind Jason Richardson.

Milwaukee Bucks (2003–2005) 
In 2003, Mason and Gary Payton were traded to the Milwaukee Bucks in exchange for Ray Allen and Ronald Murray. The trade would be remembered as one of the worst trades in Milwaukee sports history, Payton left as a free agent the following offseason and while Mason showed improvement from his Seattle days, he was no replacement for all-star-level Allen.
On November 30, 2004, Mason led all scorers with 32 points in a 95-90 loss against the Los Angeles Lakers.

New Orleans Hornets (2005–2007) 
On October 26, 2005, Mason was traded, along with a first-round draft pick in the 2006 NBA draft, to the New Orleans Hornets in exchange for Jamaal Magloire. On January 6, 2007, Mason scored 28 points in a Hornets loss against the Indiana Pacers.

Return to Milwaukee (2007–2008) 
On July 23, 2007, Mason signed a contract with the Bucks after a two-season absence. Initially angry with Bucks general manager Larry Harris for trading him in 2005, Mason said he was happy to be back in Milwaukee.

Oklahoma City Thunder (2008–2009) 
On August 13, 2008, Mason was traded to the Oklahoma City Thunder (the relocated Seattle SuperSonics franchise) in a three-team, six-player deal involving the Thunder, the Milwaukee Bucks and the Cleveland Cavaliers, that sent Milwaukee's Mo Williams to Cleveland, Mason and Cleveland's Joe Smith to Oklahoma City, and Cleveland's Damon Jones and Oklahoma City's Luke Ridnour and Adrian Griffin to Milwaukee.

Sacramento Kings (2009) 
On September 17, 2009, Mason signed a contract with the Sacramento Kings at league minimum. After playing in just five games (starting four), he was waived by the Kings. Mason's final NBA Game was played on November 4, 2009 in a 105 - 113 loss to the Atlanta Hawks. In that game, Mason played 3 and a half minutes and recorded no stats other than 1 foul.

Media appearances
In February 2007, Mason recorded a hip-hop video called We Dem Hornets in which he gave an inspirational roll-call of the entire 2006–07 Hornets team. He said: "Brandon (Bass) and I write a lot on the bus... I wrote a song about the team and let them listen to it. I rapped it to them on the bus and on the plane and a lot of the guys really liked it. I tweaked it, cleaned it up, and went over to (videographer intern and son of head coach Byron Scott) Thomas Scott's house and we put it down and then they wanted to put a video to it. It was just for fun." Commenting on the fact that the Hornets started to win after the video was shown, Mason commented: "I think it went over well. They showed it in the locker room and everybody liked it, all of the players liked it. It was done well and (the highlights) fit together really well."

In July 2018, Mason also appeared as a guest on a chartered yacht on Season 3 of the show Below Deck Mediterranean, initially in an episode entitled "Panic at the Deck-O" on the Bravo network in the United States.

NBA career statistics

Regular season

|-
| style="text-align:left;"|
| style="text-align:left;"|Seattle
| 78 || 14 || 19.5 || .431 || .269 || .736 || 3.2 || .8 || .5 || .3 || 5.9
|-
| style="text-align:left;"|
| style="text-align:left;"|Seattle
| 75 || 20 || 32.3 || .464 || .271 || .848 || 4.7 || 1.4 || .9 || .4 || 12.4
|-
| style="text-align:left;"|
| style="text-align:left;"|Seattle
| 52 || 15 || 34.8 || .436 || .291 || .740 || 6.4 || 1.8 || .9 || .4 || 14.1
|-
| style="text-align:left;"|
| style="text-align:left;"|Milwaukee
| 28 || 25 || 34.0 || .474 || .294 || .765 || 6.7 || 2.4 || .7 || .4 || 14.8
|-
| style="text-align:left;"|
| style="text-align:left;"|Milwaukee
| 82 || 31 || 30.9 || .472 || .231 || .769 || 4.4 || 1.9 || .7 || .3 || 14.4
|-
| style="text-align:left;"|
| style="text-align:left;"|Milwaukee
| 80 || 71 || 36.2 || .443 || .125 || .802 || 3.9 || 2.7 || .7 || .3 || 17.2
|-
| style="text-align:left;"|
| style="text-align:left;"|New Orleans/Oklahoma City
| 70 || 55 || 30.0 || .399 || .167 || .682 || 4.3 || .9 || .6 || .2 || 10.8
|-
| style="text-align:left;"|
| style="text-align:left;"|New Orleans/Oklahoma City
| 75 || 75 || 34.3 || .452 || .000 || .663 || 4.6 || 1.5 || .7 || .3 || 13.7
|-
| style="text-align:left;"|
| style="text-align:left;"|Milwaukee
| 59 || 56 || 28.8 || .482 || .000 || .659 || 4.3 || 2.1 || .7 || .5 || 9.7
|-
| style="text-align:left;"|
| style="text-align:left;"|Oklahoma City
| 39 || 19 || 27.3 || .435 || .000 || .541 || 4.0 || 1.2 || .4 || .8 || 7.5
|-
| style="text-align:left;"|
| style="text-align:left;"|Sacramento
| 5 || 4 || 13.2 || .417 || .000 || .750 || 2.6 || .4 || .2 || .2 || 2.6
|-
| style="text-align:center;" colspan="2"|Career
| 643 || 385 || 30.5 || .449 || .260 || .740 || 4.5 || 1.6 || .7 || .4 || 12.1

Playoffs

|-
| style="text-align:left;"|2002
| style="text-align:left;"|Seattle
| 5 || 5 || 41.0 || .421 || .333 || .588 || 6.2 || 1.8 || .8 || .4 || 11.8
|-
| style="text-align:left;"|2003
| style="text-align:left;"|Milwaukee
| 6 || 6 || 34.0 || .509 || .000 || .710 || 7.0 || .8 || 1.0 || .7 || 13.0
|-
| style="text-align:left;"|2004
| style="text-align:left;"|Milwaukee
| 5 || 5 || 39.6 || .338 || .000 || .846 || 4.8 || 2.4 || .8 || .4 || 14.4
|-
| style="text-align:center;" colspan="2"|Career
| 16 || 16 || 37.9 || .414 || .111 || .730 || 6.1 || 1.6 || .9 || .5 || 13.1

Artwork
Mason majored in studio art in college, and at one point considered becoming an art teacher. He works with a variety of media, such as oil paint, acrylic paint, watercolors, and ceramics. In 2004, he founded the Desmond Mason Art Show, which supports a variety of charitable organizations. His works have been on display at museums and galleries, such as the Gaylord-Pickens Oklahoma Heritage Museum.

Mason has been described as an abstract expressionist. "I paint by emotion so everything I create is a piece of me to some extent", he said in 2013.

Mason helped make a series of art murals in Milwaukee following the Bucks NBA Championship win in 2021.

References

External links

 
 Rap song by Mason about the Hornets' roster

1977 births
Living people
African-American basketball players
American men's basketball players
Basketball players from Texas
Milwaukee Bucks players
New Orleans Hornets players
Oklahoma City Thunder players
Oklahoma State Cowboys basketball players
People from Waxahachie, Texas
Waxahachie High School alumni
Sacramento Kings players
Seattle SuperSonics draft picks
Seattle SuperSonics players
Shooting guards
Small forwards
21st-century African-American sportspeople
20th-century African-American sportspeople